Ambalan'anjavy is a town and commune in Madagascar. It belongs to the district of Ambilobe, which is a part of Diana Region. According to 2001 commune census the population of Ambalan'anjavy was 3,743.

Only primary schooling is available in town. The majority 95% of the population are farmers, while an additional 4% receives their livelihood from raising livestock. The most important crop is rice, while other important products are cotton and seeds of catechu.  Services provide employment for 0.5% of the population. Additionally fishing employs 0.5% of the population.

References and notes 

Populated places in Diana Region